Dalla costala is a species of butterfly in the family Hesperiidae. It is found in Bolivia and Peru.

Subspecies
Dalla costala costala - Bolivia
Dalla costala ascha Evans, 1955 - Peru
Dalla costala zona Evans, 1955 - Peru

References

Butterflies described in 1955
costala